The X-99 was designed by Niels Jeppesen and built by X-Yachts and first launched in 1985 with 605 built. 
Oak frame: Hull no 1 -to 259 and hull no 270, 263 and 267 
Steal frame introduced 1990 Hull no 260 and onwards except 270, 263, 267 
Alu. framed windows introduced 1991 (MK I) Hull no 288 and onwards except 290 and 310 
Volvo engine introduced 1991 (MK I) Hull no 288 and onwards except 290 and 310 
MK II introduced 1996 Hull no 500. From there on the MK II was sold with slightly different features as two windows, needle rudder bearing and a different water pass design.
The class was recognised by the International Sailing Federation from the late 1997 to November 2010 during this period the class was entitled to an official World Championship.

Events

World Championships

Gold Cup

External links
 International X-99 Class Association
 ISAF Microsite

Sailing yachts
Former classes of World Sailing
1980s sailboat type designs
Sailboat type designs by Niels Jeppesen
Sailboat types built by x yachts